Henri-Achille Zo (2 December 1873, Bayonne9 September 1933, Onesse-Laharie) was a French painter and illustrator of Basque ancestry. His work was part of the art competitions at the 1928 Summer Olympics and the 1932 Summer Olympics.

Biography 
Later, he studied with Léon Bonnat and Albert Maignan at the École nationale supérieure des beaux-arts in Paris. He and his father were considered to be the founders of the style that came to be known as the "Bayonne School", which featured scenes from Spain and bullfighting tableaux.

He was awarded a silver medal at the Exposition Universelle (1900), which resulted in his receiving a government travel grant the following year. From 1897, he was a regular exhibitor at the Salon and won the National Prize in 1905. He also held regular showings with the "Société des Amis des Arts de Bordeaux".

For many years, he was a professor at the Académie Julian.

In 1910, he was named a Knight in the Legion of Honor.

He was killed in an automobile accident near Onesse-Laharie.

Selected works

References

Further reading 
 "Henri Zo", In: Joseph Uzanne, Figures contemporaines tirées de l'Album Mariani, Paris, Henri Floury, 1904, .
 Henri Jeanpierre, "Henri Zo, peintre de la fête, 1873-1933", In: Bulletin de la Société des Sciences, Lettres et Arts de Bayonne, #126, 1971, pp. 269–296
 Jean-Pierre Delarge, Dictionnaire des arts plastiques modernes et contemporains, Paris, Gründ, 2001 Online

External links 

More works by Zo @ ArtNet

1873 births
1933 deaths
20th-century French painters
French genre painters
Académie Julian
French illustrators
French-Basque people
Road incident deaths in France
People from Bayonne
Olympic competitors in art competitions
19th-century French painters